Rival Realms is a strategy video game developed by Activ Pub Studios for Microsoft Windows in 1998–1999.

Reception

The game received mixed reviews according to the review aggregation website GameRankings.

References

External links
 

1998 video games
Strategy video games
Titus Software games
Video games developed in the United Kingdom
Windows games
Windows-only games